St. Theresa's Medical University may refer to:
 St. Theresa's Medical University (St. Kitts)
 St. Theresa's Medical University of Yerevan